The 1981 South Carolina Gamecocks football team represented the University of South Carolina as an independent during the 1981 NCAA Division I-A football season. Led by Jim Carlen in his seventh and final season as head coach, the Gamecocks compiled a record of 6–6.

Schedule

References

South Carolina
South Carolina Gamecocks football seasons
South Carolina Gamecocks football